Jan Pietrzak (pronounced ; born 26 April 1937) is a Polish satirist, singer-songwriter, stage and film actor, and columnist for Tygodnik Solidarność (Solidarity Weekly).

Career
Pietrzak co-founded in Warsaw, with Jonasz Kofta, the student cabaret club Hybrydy, which operated in 1962–67.

In 1967 Pietrzak founded Pod Egidą ("Under the Aegis"), a subversive Warsaw literary cabaret.  Pietrzak was one of the more popular voices of anticommunism in the People's Republic of Poland.

Pietrzak attained country-wide and international recognition during the Solidarity years especially with his protest song, "Żeby Polska była Polską" ("So that Poland Could be Poland"—abroad, often called "Let Poland Be Poland") with music by Włodzimierz Korcz. The song became the widely-accepted informal anthem of Poland's Solidarity period.

Awards

In 1979, the authorities of the PRL - Polish People's Republic awarded Pietrzak with the Golden Cross of Merit.

On 3 May 2009 Pietrzak was decorated by the President of Poland with the Order of Polonia Restituta.

See also
 List of Poles

Notes

External links
  "Prawda w żartach zawarta" ("The Truth as Humor"). Interview with Jan Pietrzak by Patrycja Gruszyńska-Ruman. PDF direct download. Bulletin of the Institute of National Remembrance, no. 7 (90), July 2008; ISSN 1641-9561. Retrieved June 14, 2012. 

1937 births
Living people
Candidates in the 1995 Polish presidential election
Polish cabaret performers
Polish satirists
Polish male writers
Polish singer-songwriters
Commanders of the Order of Polonia Restituta
Recipients of the Gold Medal for Merit to Culture – Gloria Artis
20th-century Polish  male singers
Recipient of the Meritorious Activist of Culture badge